The 2000–01 NBA season was the Warriors' 55th season in the National Basketball Association, and 39th in the San Francisco Bay Area. During the off-season, the Warriors re-signed free agent and former All-Star forward Chris Mullin, while acquiring Danny Fortson from the Boston Celtics, and Bob Sura from the Cleveland Cavaliers. However, Fortson only played just six games due to a foot injury. Under new head coach Dave Cowens, the Warriors won their season opener defeating the Phoenix Suns 96–94 on October 31, but their struggles continued as they went on a 7-game losing streak afterwards. Mullin, Sura, Larry Hughes, Chris Mills, Erick Dampier, Adonal Foyle and rookie center Marc Jackson all missed large parts of the season due to injuries. With a 14–28 record in late January, the Warriors lost 37 of their final 40 games, including a 13-game losing streak to end their season finishing last place in the Pacific Division with an awful 17–65 record.

Antawn Jamison had a stellar season averaging 24.9 points and 8.7 rebounds per game, while Jackson averaged 13.2 points and 7.5 rebounds per game, was selected to the NBA All-Rookie First Team, and finished in third place in Rookie of the Year voting. Following the season, Mullin retired after his second stint with the Warriors, and second-year guard Vonteego Cummings was traded to the Philadelphia 76ers.

Offseason

Draft picks

Roster

Regular season

Season standings

z - clinched division title
y - clinched division title
x - clinched playoff spot

Record vs. opponents

Game log

Player statistics

Season

Awards and records
 Marc Jackson was selected to the All-Rookie First Team.

Transactions

Trades

Free agents

Player Transactions Citation:

References

See also
 2000-01 NBA season

Golden State Warriors seasons
Golden
Golden
Golden State